Mary Ronan was the Superintendent for Cincinnati Public Schools, unanimously voted by the Cincinnati Board of Education on April 16, 2009. She served as an Interim Superintendent on August 1, 2008, succeeding retiree Rosa Blackwell. She served as superintendent for 9 years, until retiring on August 1, 2017.

Profession
Mary Ronan began her career at Cincinnati Public Schools as a math and science teacher at the former Merry Middle School, which now acts as the Superintendent's office.

Ronan has been an educator for 32 years at this writing. She holds bachelor's degrees in biology, education and philosophy; and a master's degree in business administration.

Ronan is currently married and has a daughter schooling in the District.

Superintendent Appointment
Mary Ronan was appointed as Interim Superintendent of the district when Rosa Blackwell retired on July 31, 2008. On April 16, 2009, she was unanimously voted by the Cincinnati Board of Education as the official superintendent.

On September 23, 2019, Mary Ronan was appointed as Norwood City School District's Interim Superintendent.

References

External links
 Cincinnati Public Schools Superintendent Mary Ronan
Cincinnati Public Schools

Year of birth missing (living people)
Living people
Cincinnati Public Schools
University of Cincinnati alumni
Cincinnati Public Schools superintendents